Galactic Records is a record label owned by singer-songwriter Lil Tecca and his manager, Giuseppe Zappala. The label functions as a joint venture with Republic Records. Artists signed to the label include Lil Tecca, tana, and Tokin. The partnership was formed upon Lil Tecca's signing to Republic Records.

The label's releases include the albums We Love You Tecca, We Love You Tecca 2 , Virgo World , Gaultier and singles such as Show Me Up, MONEY ON ME, Antisocial, and off the leash!.

Roster

Current artists

Former artists

Producers

Key executives

 Giuseppe Zappala, Founder & CEO
 Simon "Alex" Cohen, General Manager

References

American record labels
Companies established in 2019